Antonia Finnane  (born 11 December 1952) is professor of Chinese History at the University of Melbourne. Her research interests have been in migration from China to Australia, particularly by Jewish refugees and in urban and cultural change in China, concentrating on consumption and clothing. Finnane retired from her teaching position at the end of 2018 following a career spanning 33 years.

Education 
Sydney-born Finnane graduated from the University of Sydney with a BA (Hons). She moved to Canberra, where she completed her PhD at the Australian National University. Her thesis was "Prosperity and Decline under the Qing: Yangzhou and its hinterland, 1644–1810".

Career 
Finnane has been awarded grants by the Australian Research Council for three Discovery projects: "Consumption in Late Imperial China", "Fashionable times" and "The fate of the artisan in revolutionary China: tailors in Beijing, 1930s–1960s". Her work has also been funded by two University of Melbourne grants, one in which she compared luxury in Renaissance Italy with Ming China and the second a study of "Memory and Commemoration in Asia and the West".

Finnane has contributed articles to many journals, including The Journal of Asian Studies, Asian Studies Review, Journal of Economic and Social History of the Orient, Modern China and The China Quarterly.

Works

As author

As editor

Awards and recognition 

 2006 Joseph Levenson Book Prize for a work on pre-1900 China, for Speaking of Yangzhou: A Chinese city, 1550–1850
 Woodward Medal in Humanities and Social Sciences, University of Melbourne, 2007
 Elected Fellow of the Australian Academy of the Humanities (FAHA), 2008

References 

1952 births
Living people
University of Sydney alumni
Australian National University alumni
Academic staff of the University of Melbourne
Australian sinologists
Australian women historians
Fellows of the Australian Academy of the Humanities